The Chronicle of Early Kings, named ABC 20 in Grayson’s Assyrian and Babylonian Chronicles and CM 40 in Glassner’s Chroniques mésopotamiennes is a Babylonian chronicle preserved on two tablets: tablet A is well preserved whereas tablet B is broken and the text is fragmentary.
The text is episodic in character, and seems to have been composed from linking together the apodoses of omen literature, excerpts of the Weidner Chronicle and kings year-names. The Chronicle begins with events from the late third-millennium reign of Sargon of Akkad and ends, where the tablet is broken away, with the reign of Agum III, c.a 1500 BC.

A third tablet, named Fragment B or CM 41, deals with related subject matter and may be a variant tradition of the same type of work.

The text

Tablet A begins with a lengthy passage concerning the rise and eventual downfall of Sargon of Akkad, caused by his impious treatment of Babylon:

This seemingly anachronous reference to Babylon reproduces text from the Weidner Chronicle. Little is known of the city of Babylon in the third-millennium with the earliest reference to it coming from a year-name of Šar-kali-šarri, Sargon’s grandson. In contrast, the Chronicle devotes a mere six lines to his nephew, Naram-Sin, and two campaigns against Apišal, a city located in northern Syria, and Magan, thought to be in ancient Oman. That of Apišal appears as an apodosis to an omen in the Bārûtu, the compendium of sacrificial omens.

Šulgi receives short shrift from Marduk, who wreaks a terrible revenge for his expropriation of the property of Marduk’s temple, the Ésagil, and Babylon, as he “caused (something or other) to consume his body and killed him” in a passage that, despite its perfect state of preservation, remains unintelligible. Erra-Imittī’s legendary tale of his demise and that of Enlil-bāni’s ascendency occupies the next passage, followed by a terse observation that “Ilu-šūma was king of Assyria in time of Su-abu”, who was once identified with Sumu-abum, the founder of the First Dynasty of Babylon until a consideration of the relative chronologies made this identification unlikely. The tablet concludes with the label or mark GIGAM.DIDLI which may have been a scribal catalog reference or alternatively denote continuing disruption, as GIGAM represents ippiru, “strife, conflict.”

Tablet B opens with a duplication of the six lines telling of the demise of Erra-Imittī, followed by a section relating Ḫammu-rāpi’s expedition against Rim-Sin I, whom he brought to Babylon in a ki-is-kap (a ḫúppu), a large basket. Samsu-iluna’s handling of the revolt of Rim-Sin II occupies the next section, but here the text is poorly preserved and the events uncertain until it records the victory of Ilum-ma-ilī, the founder of the Sealand Dynasty, over Samsu-iluna’s army. Abī-Ešuḫ’s damming of the Tigris follows, which fails to contain the wiley Ilum-ma-ilī. The history of the First Babylonian dynasty concludes with the Hittite invasion during the reign of Samsu-ditāna.

The final two passages switch to events in the early Kassite Dynastic period, first with the last king of the Sealand Dynasty, Ea-gamil, fleeing ahead of the invasion of Ulam-Buriaš and then the second invasion led by Agum III.

Principal publications

  copy and translation
  normalization and translation
  translation
  translation
  transliteration and translation
  transliteration and translation

Inscriptions

See also
Chronology of the ancient Near East

References

External links
 Chronicle of Early Kings at Livius

Babylonia
Mesopotamian chronicles
Clay tablets